Alevga  is an abandoned village in the Nicosia District of Cyprus, south of the Kokkina exclave but in an area still controlled by the Cypriot government. The village was almost exclusively inhabited by Turkish Cypriots prior to 1960.

References

Communities in Nicosia District
Turkish Cypriot villages depopulated after the 1974 Turkish invasion of Cyprus